Eva Milada Ruth Kushner  ( Dubska; June 18, 1929 – January 28, 2023) was a Canadian scholar of Comparative literature and French, Renaissance, and Canadian literature. She was the President of Victoria University in 1987. In 1997, she was made an Officer of the Order of Canada. She was the first woman to be a university president in Ontario, Canada.

Biography
Eva Dubska was born in Prague, Czechoslovakia on June 18, 1929. She lived in France from 1939 to 1945, returned briefly to Czechoslovakia after World War II, and then moved to Canada in 1946.

Kushner attended McGill University and obtained a BA in Philosophy and Psychology in 1948. In 1950, she obtained an MA in Philosophy and in 1956, she obtained a PhD in French Literature.  In 1971, she was named as a Fellow of the Royal Society of Canada.

Kushner became President of Victoria University in 1987 and held that position until 1994. She also served as Chair of the Royal Society of Canada Committee on Freedom of Scholarship and Science from 1993 to 1998.

In 1997, the Canadian government awarded her the Order of Canada award.

Personal life
In 1949, Eva Dubska married scientist and writer Donn Kushner. The two were together until his death in 2001. They had three sons, Daniel, Roland and Paul.  

Kushner died on January 28, 2023, at the age of 93.

Works

As author

As editor

References

External links 

1929 births
2023 deaths
McGill University alumni
Fellows of the Royal Society of Canada
Officers of the Order of Canada
Czechoslovak emigrants to Canada
People from Prague
20th-century Canadian educators
20th-century women educators
Canadian women academics
Women heads of universities and colleges